John Rogers Maxwell Sr. (November 20, 1846 – December 10, 1910) was Chairman of the Executive Committee of the Central Railroad of New Jersey, for many years President of the Atlas Portland Cement Company.

Biography
He was born in 1846. He died on December 10, 1910 at his home at 78 Eighth Avenue in Brooklyn, of cerebral apoplexy.

References

1846 births
1910 deaths
American male sailors (sport)